Samoa is made up of eleven itūmālō (political districts). These are the traditional eleven districts that were established well before European arrival. Each district has its own constitutional foundation (faavae) based on the traditional order of title precedence found in each district's faalupega (traditional salutations).

The capital village of each district administers and coordinates the affairs of the district and confers each districts' paramount title, amongst other responsibilities.

Examples of District Governance 
A'ana has its capital at Leulumoega. The paramount title of A'ana is the Tui A'ana. The orator group which confers this titlethe Faleiva (House of Nine)is based at Leulumoega. The paramount tama-a-'āiga title of A'ana is Tuimalealiifano of Falelatai.  

There is currently no holder of the Tui A'ana title as the orator polity of Leulumoega is yet to decide. 

In Tuamasaga, the paramount matai title of Malietoa is conferred by the Sa Malietoa of Malie. The pāpā titles of Gatoaitele and Vaetamasoalii are known as pāpā fafine, owing to their roots with the original female occupants. Both titles are conferred by the Fale Tuamasaga based in Afega and Safata respectively.  

The current holder of the Malietoa title is Malietoa Moli, son of former Head of State, Malietoa Tanumafili II. The current Gatoaitele holder is Savea Sano Malifa, owner of the Samoa Observer newspaper. There is no current holder of the Vaetamasoalii pāpā title.  

Atua has its capital at Lufilufi, a former part of Falefa that was designated as its own village following the events that gave it its name. The paramount pāpā title and sovereign of Atua is the Tui Atua. The orator group which confers this title is the Faleono (House of Six) senior orators of Lufilufi.The two paramount matai - called tama-a-'āiga - are Tupua Tamasese, which is conferred by the Aiga Sa Fenunu'ivao (Descendants of Fenunu'ivao, mother of Tupua Fuiavailili) of Falefa and Salani; and Matā'afa, conferred by the Aiga Sa Levālasi (Descendants of Levālasi, mother of Salamāsina) of Lotofaga and Āmaile. Samoa's first Prime Minister, Fiame Matā'afa Faumuina Mulinu'u II was a holder of the Matā'afa title.  

The current holder of the Tupua Tamasese and Tui Atua titles is former Prime Minister and Head of State Tui Atua Tupua Tamasese Efi.

Political districts

Exclaves of political districts
Note that several districts include multiple exclaves:
Gaga'emauga: besides the main part on Savai'i, there are two small exclaves on Upolu: Salamumu and Le'auva'a this is the only district with areas on both main islands
Satupa'itea: consists of two separate areas on the south side of Savai'i
Palauli: consists of two separate areas on the south side of Savai'i
A'ana: besides the main part, there is a small exclave (Satuimalufilufi village)
Va'a-o-Fonoti: besides the main part, there is a small exclave (Faleāpuna village)
Aiga-i-le-Tai: includes the islands Manono, Apolima and Nu'ulopa
Atua: includes the Aleipata Islands and Nu'usafe'e island

Electoral districts

The itūmālō are further subdivided in 51 faipule districts. They have no administrative function, but serve as single-member electoral constituencies. The faipule districts are also used as regional units for statistics.

The faipule electoral districts are based loosely on the traditional sub-districts of the Itūmālō. For example, the faipule districts of Anoama'a West and Anoama'a East are based on the traditional sub-district of Anoama'a in the northern half of the Atua district.

Villages
At the local level, there are 265 villages. Additionally, there are 71 villages in Tuamasaga district the capital Apia is composed of (58 villages in Vaimauga West and 13 in Faleata East electoral districts). Apia does not have a common administration, the local power rests with the constituent villages.

See also
List of cities, towns and villages in Samoa
ISO 3166-2:WS

References

External links
Map: election districts

 
Subdivisions of Samoa
Samoa, Districts
Samoa 1
Districts, Samoa
Samoa geography-related lists